KAGAT or kagat refers to:

 Kor Agama Angkatan Tentera (KAGAT), a Muslim chaplain service of the Malaysian Army
 , a cultivar of Karuka